Doug Barwick (born 6 February 1962) is a former Australian rules footballer who represented Fitzroy and Collingwood in the Australian Football League.

Recruited from East Launceston, Barwick made his debut in Round 1 of the 1984 VFL season against Geelong at Kardinia Park. A strong mark and a long kick for his size, Barwick was a tough half-forward who was a handy goalkicker. He played 76 games for Fitzroy before moving to Collingwood in 1988. Barwick played in the Magpies' 1990 drought-breaking premiership, kicking two goals. He retired in 1991 at the age of 29, with 147 games and 217 goals to his name, along with a premiership medallion. He also represented Victoria in 1987 and Tasmania in 1990 and 1991.

He was named a life member of the Collingwood in 2010.

References

External links

1962 births
Living people
Australian rules footballers from Launceston, Tasmania
Collingwood Football Club players
Collingwood Football Club Premiership players
Dandenong Football Club players
East Launceston Football Club players
Fitzroy Football Club players
One-time VFL/AFL Premiership players
South Launceston Football Club players
Tasmanian Football Hall of Fame inductees
Tasmanian State of Origin players